La Verrière is a commune in the Yvelines department in the Île-de-France in north-central France.

Population

Transport
La Verrière station is served by Transilien trains to Paris and Rambouillet.

Education
Preschools and elementary schools in La Verrière:
 École du Parc
 École régionale
 École du Bois de l’Étang

Preschools:
 École des Noës

Collège intercommunal Philippe de Champaigne in Le Mesnil-Saint-Denis serves the junior high school students of La Verrière.

Area senior high schools/sixth form colleges are located in other communes:
 Lycée Dumont d’Urville Elancourt-Maurepas, Maurepas
 Lycée des Sept-Mares,  Maurepas
 Lycée de la Plaine de Neauphle, Trappes
 Lycée d’Enseignement Professionnel Industriel Louis Blériot, Trappes

Versailles Saint-Quentin-en-Yvelines University provides tertiary educational services.

See also
Communes of the Yvelines department

References

External links

 Home page 

Communes of Yvelines
Saint-Quentin-en-Yvelines